The Piano Concerto No. 27 in B major, K. 595, is Wolfgang Amadeus Mozart's last piano concerto; it was first performed early in 1791, the year of his death.

History 
The manuscript is dated 5 January 1791. However, Alan Tyson's analysis of the paper on which Mozart composed the work indicated that Mozart used this paper between December 1788 and February 1789, which implies composition well before 1791. Simon Keefe has written that the composition of the work dates from 1788. By contrast, Wolfgang Rehm has stated that Mozart composed this concerto in late 1790 and early 1791. Cliff Eisen has discussed the controversy over the time of composition in his review of the published facsimile of the score.

Premiere 
The work followed by some years the series of highly successful concertos Mozart wrote. The concerto may have been first performed at a concert on 4 March 1791 in Jahn's Hall by Mozart and the clarinetist Joseph Beer. If so, this was Mozart's last appearance in a public concert, as he fell ill in September 1791 and died on 5 December 1791. Another possibility is that it was premiered by Mozart's pupil Barbara Ployer on the occasion of a public concert at the Palais Auersperg in January 1791.

Music 
The work is scored for flute, two oboes, two bassoons, two horns, solo piano and strings, which makes it thinner than Mozart's other late concertos, all of which except for No. 23 have trumpet and timpani.

It has three movements:

Although all three movements are in a major key, minor keys are suggested, as is evident from the second theme of the first movement (in the dominant minor), as well as the presence of a remote minor key in the early development of that movement and of the tonic minor in the middle of the Larghetto.

Another interesting characteristic of the work is its rather strong thematic integration of the movements, which would become ever more important in the nineteenth century. The principal theme of the Larghetto, for instance, is revived as the second theme of the final movement (in measure 65). The principal theme for the finale was also used in Mozart's song "Sehnsucht nach dem Frühling" (also called "Komm, lieber Mai"), K. 596, which immediately follows this concerto in the Köchel catalogue.

Mozart wrote down his cadenzas for the first and third movements.

Simon Keefe has discussed the concerto in detail, with emphasis on the distinctive character and experiments in style of the concerto compared to Mozart's other concerti in this genre.

References 

Sources
Deutsch, Otto Erich (1965) Mozart: A Documentary Biography. Stanford: Stanford University Press.

External links 

BBC Discovering Music (browse for .ram file for discussion of this work)

27
Compositions in B-flat major
1788 compositions
1791 compositions